Don Sila is a village and tambon (subdistrict) of Wiang Chai District, in Chiang Rai Province, Thailand. In 2005 it had a population of 9,920 people. The tambon contains 17 villages.

References

Tambon of Chiang Rai province
Populated places in Chiang Rai province